

State-funded schools

Primary schools

Alice Ingham RC Primary School, Rochdale
Alkrington Primary School, Alkrington
All Saints CE Primary School, Rochdale
All Souls CE Primary School, Heywood
Ashfield Valley Primary School, Rochdale
Bamford Academy, Rochdale
Belfield Community School, Belfield
Boarshaw Community Primary School, Middleton
Bowlee Park Community Primary School, Langley
Brimrod Community Primary School, Rochdale
Broadfield Community Primary School, Rochdale
Caldershaw Primary School, Rochdale
Castleton Primary School, Castleton
Crossgates Primary School, Milnrow
Deeplish Primary Academy, Rochdale
Elm Wood Primary School, Middleton
Greenbank Primary School, Rochdale
Hamer Community Primary School, Rochdale
Harwood Park Primary School, Heywood
Healey Foundation Primary School, Rochdale
Heap Bridge Village Primary School, Heywood
Heybrook Primary School, Rochdale
Hollin Primary School, Middleton
Holy Family RC Primary School, Rochdale
Holy Trinity CE Primary School, Littleborough
Hopwood Community Primary School, Heywood
Kentmere Primary Academy, Smallbridge
Little Heaton CE Primary School, Middleton
Littleborough Community Primary School, Littleborough
Lowerplace Primary School, Rochdale
Marland Hill Community Primary School, Rochdale
Meanwood Community Nursery and Primary School, Rochdale
Middleton Parish CE Primary School, Middleton
Milnrow Parish CE Primary School, Milnrow
Moorhouse Academy, Milnrow
Newhey Community Primary School, Newhey
Norden Community Primary School, Norden
Our Lady and St Paul's RC Primary School, Darnhill
Parkfield Primary School, Middleton
Sacred Heart RC Primary School, Rochdale
St Andrew's CE Primary School and Nursery, Rochdale
St Edward's CE Primary School, Castleton
St Gabriel's CE Primary School, Middleton
St Gabriel's RC Primary School, Castleton
St James' CE Primary School, Wardle
St John Fisher RC Primary School, Middleton
St John's CE Primary School, Thornham
St John's RC Primary School, Rochdale
St Joseph's RC Primary School, Heywood
St Luke's CE Primary School, Heywood
St Margaret's CE Primary School, Heywood
St Mary's CE Primary School, Balderstone
St Mary’s RC Primary School, Langley
St Mary's RC Primary School, Littleborough
St Michael's CE Primary School, Alkrington
St Michael's CE Primary School, Bamford
St Patrick's RC Primary School, Rochdale
St Peter's CE Primary School, Rochdale
St Peter's RC Primary School, Middleton
St Thomas' CE Primary School, Newhey
St Thomas More RC Primary School, Alkrington
St Vincent's RC Primary, Norden
Sandbrook Community Primary School, Rochdale
Shawclough Community Primary School, Shawclough
Smithy Bridge Foundation Primary School, Littleborough
Spotland Primary School, Rochdale
Stansfield Hall CE/Free Church Primary School, Littleborough
Whittaker Moss Primary School, Norden
Woodland Community Primary School, Heywood

Secondary schools

Cardinal Langley RC High School, Middleton
Edgar Wood Academy, Middleton
Falinge Park High School, Shawclough
Hollingworth Academy, Milnrow
Holy Family RC & CE College, Heywood
Kingsway Park High School, Rochdale
Matthew Moss High School, Rochdale
Middleton Technology School, Middleton
Newhouse Academy, Heywood
Oulder Hill Leadership Academy, Rochdale
St Anne's Academy, Middleton
St Cuthbert's RC High School, Thornham
Wardle Academy, Wardle

Special and alternative schools
Brownhill School, Rochdale
Newlands School, Middleton
Redwood, Rochdale
Rochdale Pupil Referral Service, Belfield
Springside, Rochdale

Further education
Hopwood Hall College
Rochdale Sixth Form College

Independent schools

Senior and all-through schools
Beech House School, Rochdale
Rochdale Islamic Academy, Rochdale
Rochdale Islamic Academy for Girls, Rochdale

Special and alternative schools
Cedar Lodge School, Middleton
Elizabeth House School, Middleton
Great Howarth School, Rochdale
Meadows School, Wardle
Willow View School, Rochdale

References

 Rochdale Council Schools and Colleges
 Ofsted (Office for Standards in Education)

 
Rochdale